Thomas Kenneth Mattingly II (born March 17, 1936) is an American former aviator, aeronautical engineer, test pilot, rear admiral in the United States Navy and astronaut who flew on the Apollo 16, STS-4 and STS-51-C missions.

Mattingly had been scheduled to fly on the Apollo 13 mission, but three days prior to launch, he was held back and replaced by Jack Swigert due to exposure to German measles (which Mattingly did not contract). Mattingly later flew as Command Module Pilot for Apollo 16 and made 64 lunar orbits, making him one of 24 people to have flown to the Moon. Mattingly and his commander from Apollo 16, John Young, are the only people to have flown to the Moon and also a Space Shuttle orbital mission (Fred Haise, his former training crewmate from Apollo 13, did atmospheric flight testing of the Space Shuttle Approach and Landing Tests).

During Apollo 16's return flight to Earth, Mattingly performed an extravehicular activity (EVA) to retrieve film cassettes from the exterior of the spacecraft, the command and service module. It was the second "deep space" EVA in history, at great distance from any planetary body.

Early life and education 
Thomas Kenneth Mattingly II was born on March 17, 1936, in Chicago, Illinois, to Thomas Kenneth Mattingly (1903–1995) and Constance Mason Mattingly (1905–1997). His father, who had been hired by Eastern Airlines soon after his son's birth, moved the family to Hialeah, Florida. Aviation became part of Mattingly's life from a very young age; he later recalled that his "earliest memories ... all had to do with airplanes".

Mattingly was active in the Boy Scouts of America where he achieved its second highest rank, Life Scout. He graduated from Miami Edison High School in 1954, and went on to receive a Bachelor of Science degree in Aeronautical Engineering from Auburn University in 1958. He was also a member of Delta Tau Delta fraternity (Epsilon Alpha chapter).

Military career 
Mattingly joined the U.S. Navy as an Ensign in 1958 and received his aviator wings in 1960. He was then assigned to Attack Squadron Thirty-five (VA-35) at Naval Air Station Oceana, Virginia and flew Douglas A-1H Skyraider propeller aircraft aboard the aircraft carrier  from 1960 to 1963. In July 1963, he was transferred to Heavy Attack Squadron Eleven (VAH-11) at Naval Air Station Sanford, Florida, where he flew Douglas A-3B Skywarrior jet aircraft for two years and deployed aboard .

While based at Sanford, a fellow officer of Mattingly's was assigned to a undertake aerial photo reconnaissance of a launch from Cape Canaveral and convinced Mattingly to accompany him on this mission, where they observed the launch of Gemini 3 (carrying Mattingly's future Apollo 16 Commander John W. Young) from the air. After finishing his second cruise, Mattingly was frustrated in his attempt to join the United States Naval Test Pilot School at Naval Air Station Patuxent River since his cruise ended after the start of the class. However, he managed to obtain a place in the U.S. Air Force Aerospace Research Pilot School at Edwards Air Force Base in California, where future astronauts Edgar Mitchell and Karol J. Bobko were his classmates and his instructors included Charles Duke, his Apollo 16 crewmate, and Henry W. Hartsfield Jr., whom Mattingly would command on STS-4.

Mattingly has logged 7,200 hours of flight time—which includes 5,000 hours in jet aircraft.

NASA career

Selection and training 
On September 10, 1965, NASA began the selection process for the fifth astronaut group. From a pool of 351 applicants, NASA selected 159 candidates that met the basic qualifications that required that applicants must be United States citizens born on or after December 1, 1929, and no more than six feet tall. They were also required to have at least 1,000 hours of flight time in jet aircraft. Mattingly had previously shown little interest and inclination to apply for the astronaut program, however, his views changed when at the Air Force Test Pilot School and his class was offered the chance to apply for either NASA or the United States Air Force (USAF) Manned Orbiting Laboratory program. Mattingly and Mitchell chose the latter and were rejected. The deadline for applying for the NASA group had passed, however one of their instructors was able to get NASA to accept their applications. On the interview panel the astronaut office representatives were John W. Young and Michael Collins, at that time in training as prime crew for Gemini 10. Mattingly would later recollect that he was "perplexed" by Young. Collins asked Mattingly how he felt about the Lockheed F-104 Starfighter, to which Mattingly replied that he thought it was a "fun aircraft" but without worth in combat. Collins appeared to dislike the answer and Mattingly felt he had blown his chance. However, after the conclusion of the selection process, Mattingly was called by NASA’s Director of Flight Crew Operations Deke Slayton with an offer to become an astronaut.

At the time of his selection, Mattingly had 2,582 hours of flight experience, including 1,036 hours in jet aircraft. He also had a bachelor's degree in engineering or in the physical or biological sciences as required by the initial qualifications. From the 100 military personnel and 59 civilian candidates, NASA selected 19 to join the group for training as astronauts.

Mattingly, a lieutenant in the Navy, was a student at the U.S. Air Force Aerospace Research Pilot School at Edwards AFB, California, when NASA selected him as an astronaut in April 1966.

Apollo 8 and Apollo 11 

At first, Mattingly was part of the support crew for Apollo 8. Mattingly served as CAPCOM during Apollo 8's second television transmission and subsequent preparation for trans-Earth injection.

He then trained parallel with Bill Anders for Apollo 11 as backup Command Module Pilot, because Anders was going to retire from NASA in August 1969 and, in case of mission delay, would be unavailable.

Apollo 13 

Mattingly's first prime assignment was to be the Command Module Pilot on the Apollo 13 mission. Originally, Lovell, Mattingly and Haise were scheduled to fly on Apollo 14 but his crew was switched to Apollo 13 so that the commander of the other crew, Alan Shepard, who was grounded during Project Gemini could train longer. Three days prior to launch, he was removed from the mission due to exposure to German measles (which he never contracted) and was replaced by the backup CM pilot, Jack Swigert. As a result, he missed the dramatic in-flight explosion that crippled the spacecraft. However, Mattingly played a large role in helping the crew solve the problem of power conservation during re-entry.

Apollo 16 

The swapout from Apollo 13 placed Mattingly on the crew that would fly Apollo 16 (April 16–27, 1972), the fifth crewed lunar landing mission. The crew included John Young (Commander), Mattingly (Command Module Pilot), and Charlie Duke (Lunar Module Pilot). The mission assigned to Apollo 16 was to collect samples from the lunar highlands near the crater Descartes. While in lunar orbit the scientific instruments aboard the Command/Service Module Casper extended the photographic and geochemical mapping of a belt around the lunar equator. A combined total of 26 separate scientific experiments were conducted in lunar orbit and during cislunar coast.

During the return leg of the mission, Mattingly carried out an extravehicular activity (EVA) to retrieve film and data packages from the science bay on the side of the service module. Although the mission of Apollo 16 was terminated one day early due to concern over several spacecraft malfunctions, all major objectives were accomplished.

Space Shuttle flights 

Following his return to Earth, Mattingly served in astronaut managerial positions in the Space Shuttle development program.

This seven-day mission was designed to further verify ascent and entry phases of shuttle missions; perform continued studies of the effects of long-term thermal extremes on the orbiter subsystems; and conduct a survey of orbiter-induced contamination on the orbiter payload bay. Additionally, the crew operated several scientific experiments located in the orbiter's cabin and in the payload bay. These experiments included the Continuous Flow Electrophoresis System experiment designed to investigate the separation of biological materials in a fluid according to their surface electrical charge. This experiment was a pathfinder for the first commercial venture to capitalize on the unique characteristics of space. The crew is also credited with effecting an in-flight repair which enabled them to activate the first operational "Getaway Special" (composed of nine experiments that ranged from algae and duckweed growth in space to fruit fly and brine shrimp genetic studies). STS-4 completed 112 orbits of the Earth before landing at Edwards Air Force Base, California, on July 4, 1982. Mattingly and Hartsfield were greeted by President Ronald Reagan after the landing; Reagan recognized the pair, both graduates of Auburn University, as "you two sons of Auburn" in his welcoming speech.

STS-51-C, the first Space Shuttle Department of Defense mission, launched from Kennedy Space Center, Florida on January 24, 1985. The crew included Mattingly (spacecraft commander), Loren Shriver (pilot), James Buchli and Ellison Onizuka (Mission Specialists), and Gary Payton (DOD Payload Specialist). Landing occurred on January 27, 1985.

Post-NASA career 
In 1985, Mattingly retired from NASA, then retired from the Navy the following year with the two-star rank of Rear admiral (upper half), and entered the private sector. He worked as a Director in Grumman's Space Station Support Division. He then headed the Atlas booster program for General Dynamics in San Diego, California. At Lockheed Martin he was Vice President in charge of the X-33 development program. He then worked at Systems Planning and Analysis in Virginia.

Mattingly is a member of many organizations. He is an associate fellow, American Institute of Aeronautics and Astronautics; fellow, American Astronautical Society; and member, Society of Experimental Test Pilots, and the U.S. Naval Institute.

Awards and honors 
Mattingly is a recipient of numerous awards. He was awarded the NASA Distinguished Service Medal (2); Johnson Space Center Certificate of Commendation (1970); JSC Group Achievement Award (1972); Navy Distinguished Service Medal; Navy Expeditionary Medal; National Defense Service Medal; NASA Space Flight Medal;  Navy Astronaut Wings; Society of Experimental Test Pilots Ivan C. Kincheloe Award (1972); Delta Tau Delta Achievement Award (1972); Auburn Alumni Engineers Council Outstanding Achievement Award (1972); American Astronautical Society Flight Achievement Award for 1972; AIAA Haley Astronautics Award for 1973; Fédération Aéronautique Internationale awarded him the V. M. Komarov Diploma in 1973; Department of Defense Distinguished Service Medal (1982).

Mattingly was inducted with a group of Apollo astronauts into the International Space Hall of Fame in 1983. He was one of 24 Apollo astronauts who were inducted into the U.S. Astronaut Hall of Fame in 1997.

Personal life 
In 1970, he married Elizabeth Dailey. They have one child.

In media 
Mattingly was portrayed in the 1995 movie Apollo 13 by Gary Sinise. Both Mattingly and Sinise share a birthday (March 17). He was portrayed in the 1998 HBO miniseries From the Earth to the Moon by Željko Ivanek.

See also 
 The Astronaut Monument

References

External links 

 Astronautix biography of Ken Mattingly
 Spacefacts biography of Ken Mattingly
 Mattingly at Encyclopedia of Science
 Iven C. Kincheloe Awards
 NASA JSC: T. K. Mattingly Oral History
 

 
20th-century American businesspeople
1936 births
1972 in spaceflight
1982 in spaceflight
1985 in spaceflight
American aerospace engineers
American test pilots
Apollo 13
Apollo 16
Apollo program astronauts
Auburn University alumni
Aviators from Illinois
Engineers from Illinois
Living people
Military personnel from Chicago
People from Hialeah, Florida
Recipients of the Defense Distinguished Service Medal
Recipients of the NASA Distinguished Service Medal
Space Shuttle program astronauts
U.S. Air Force Test Pilot School alumni
United States Astronaut Hall of Fame inductees
United States Naval Aviators
United States Navy astronauts
United States Navy rear admirals (upper half)
Spacewalkers